Kimberly Jean Burrell (born August 27, 1972) is an American, Grammy–nominated, gospel singer-songwriter, producer, and pastor from Houston, Texas, United States.

Biography

Early life
Born Kimberly Jean Burrell on August 27, 1972 in Houston, Texas, Burrell was one of four children born to Julius Burrell Jr., a pastor, and Helen Ruth Graham, an evangelist singer in The Church of God in Christ. As a youth, Burrell began performing with Reverend James Cleveland's GMWA Youth Mass Choir (also known as Rev. James Cleveland's Kids).

Career

1989–2003
Burrell's performances continued with Trinity Temple Full Gospel Mass Choir of Dallas and The Inspirational Sounds Mass Choir of Houston. In 1996, she was a featured singer on the reprise of "Jesus Paid It All" on Ricky Dillard & New G's album Worked It Out. Her first independent album, Try Me Again, was released on the Texas-based boutique label Pearl Records in 1995. This led to her being signed to Tommy Boy Gospel and releasing another album, Everlasting Life (1999), produced by Asaph Alexander Ward. The album peaked at #10 on the Billboard Gospel Charts. Burrell recorded Live In Concert, a live album in November 2000 at the annual COGIC Convention in Memphis, Tennessee. The album was released in 2001. It was nominated for a Grammy Award for Best Soul Gospel Album in 2002. Though Tommy Boy Gospel closed shortly after the release of Live In Concert, by 2002, she had signed a recording contract with Elektra Records. Under this contract she recorded only a guest appearance on the all-star gospel track "Higher Ground", which first appeared as a bonus track on Missy Elliott's album Miss E... So Addictive and was later featured on Karen Clark Sheard's 2nd Chance album. Burrell has continued to perform live and to collaborate with other artists. Though only intermittently active as a recording artist, she established and hosts the annual Ephesians 4 conference, a workshop for performing artists.

2004–present
In 2004, Burrell was a guest performer along with Kelly Price on R. Kelly's "3-Way Phone Call" playing the part of Price's "prayer partner" in the soap opera-like song. She appeared in George Clinton's original song "Mathematics of Love" on Clinton's 2008 album of covers, George Clinton and Some Gangsters of Love. Burrell released her first studio album in 11 years, No Ways Tired, on April 7, 2009 through Shanachie Records. The album features covers of classic gospel songs like "My Faith Looks Up To Thee," "What A Friend We Have In Jesus," "O Lamb Of God" and "I Surrender All," as well as the classic James Cleveland song after which the album is named. Burrell sang "I see a Victory" with Pharrell Williams for the soundtrack to the feature film Hidden Figures (2016).

Personal

Controversies
In December 2016, a video surfaced showing Burrell preaching a sermon at the Love & Liberty Fellowship Church. In that sermon, she called people who engage in homosexual acts "perverted" and said they had been deceived by the "homosexual spirit." She also warned that people who "play with" homosexual sin would "die from it" in 2017. In response to considerable criticism, Burrell said that she makes "no excuses or apologies" for the sermon, adding "I love you, and God loves you, but he hates the sin in you and me." Shortly after the video of the sermon surfaced, The Ellen DeGeneres Show cancelled Burrell's scheduled appearance, as did the BMI Trailblazers of Gospel Music event, where she was removed as an honoree. Her radio talk show, Bridging the Gap with Kim Burrell, was cancelled by Texas Southern University.

In July 2022, Burrell faced backlash for making remarks urging churchgoers not to make friends with "broke" people. She also jokingly referred to them as "ugly" in addition to promoting anti-masking and anti-vaccination with respect to COVID-19.

Selected discography

Albums
 Try Me Again (Pearl, 1995)
 Everlasting Life (Tommy Boy Gospel, 1998)
 Live In Concert (Tommy Boy Gospel, 2001)
 No Ways Tired (Shanachie, 2009)
 The Love Album (Shanachie, 2011)
 A Different Place (Shanachie, 2015)

Singles
 "Special Place" (Bad Boy Entertainment, 2001)
 "Little Drummer Boy" (New Brand Records, 2018)
 "Working For Your Good" (New Brand Records & Malloy Entertainment, 2022)

Videos
 Live In Concert (VHS) (Tommy Boy Gospel, 2001)

Other appearances

Awards
 2000 Gospel Music Excellence Award, Female Vocalist of the Year - Contemporary for Everlasting Life
 2000 Stellar Award, Contemporary Female Vocalist of the Year for Everlasting Life
2009 Grammy nomination, Best Gospel/ Contemporary Christian Album “I Understand”
 2012 Stellar Award, Albertina Walker Female Vocalist of the Year for The Love Album
 2012 Stellar Award, Contemporary Female of the Year for The Love Album
 2012 Dove Award, Urban Recorded Song of the Year for "Sweeter"
2012 Grammy nomination, Best Gospel Album “The Love Album”.

References

External links
 
 
 
 
 

Living people
American gospel singers
20th-century American singers
African-American women singer-songwriters
American Pentecostals
African-American Christians
Musicians from Houston
Singer-songwriters from Texas
Tommy Boy Records artists
Elektra Records artists
Epic Records artists
Shanachie Records artists
20th-century American women singers
21st-century American women singers
21st-century American singers
20th-century African-American women singers
21st-century African-American women singers
1972 births